Amy Quan Barry (born Saigon) is an American poet and novelist. She is a recipient of the Agnes Lynch Starrett Poetry Prize.

Biography
She was raised in Danvers, Massachusetts, where she played on the Danvers High School field hockey team in the late 1980s.

She graduated from the University of Michigan, with an MFA, and was a Wallace Stegner fellow at Stanford University and the Diane Middlebrook poetry fellow at the University of Wisconsin. She teaches at the University of Wisconsin–Madison.

Her work has appeared in The Kenyon Review, The Missouri Review, The New Yorker, Southeast Review, and Virginia Quarterly Review.

Works

Novels 
 
We Ride Upon Sticks. Penguin Random House. 2020. 
When I'm Gone, Look for Me in the East. Penguin Random House. 2022.

Poetry collections

Anthologies

Journals

 
 
"errata from the field: demographics", AGNI
"mission statement, or the Saturday after Sinatra died", AGNI
"The impulsive man acts with fierceness", Kenyon Review, April 2009 
"Doug Flutie's 1984 Orange Bowl Hail Mary as Water into Fire ", Crossroads
"Cruz del Condor", Linebreak

Awards and honors
2010 Donald Hall Prize in Poetry, Water Puppets
2012 PEN/Open Book, finalist, Water Puppets

See also
List of poets from the United States

References

External links
University of Pittsburgh Press author page
Poetry Foundation profile
"She Weeps Each Time You're Born", NPR
"Featured Poet: Quan Barry", Perihelion
UW faculty page

Agnes Lynch Starrett Poetry Prize winners
Poets from Wisconsin
Writers from Wisconsin
Vietnamese emigrants to the United States
University of Michigan alumni
University of Wisconsin–Madison faculty
Year of birth missing (living people)
Living people
Stegner Fellows